Sam Wright (born 28 September 1997) is an English professional footballer who plays for Belper Town, as a midfielder.

Career
He made his senior debut for Bradford City on 9 November 2016, in an EFL Trophy game against Morecambe.

Career statistics

References

External links
Sam Wright at Footballdatabase

1997 births
Living people
English footballers
Bradford City A.F.C. players
Ossett Town F.C. players
Sheffield F.C. players
Belper Town F.C. players
Bradford (Park Avenue) A.F.C. players
Association football midfielders